Vasco Sousa may refer to:

 Vasco Martins de Sousa (1320–1387), Portuguese nobleman
 Vasco Sousa (swimmer) (born 1964), Portuguese swimmer
 Vasco Sousa (footballer) (born 2003), Portuguese footballer